Seaton is a seaside town, fishing harbour and civil parish in East Devon on the south coast of England, between Axmouth (to the east) and Beer (to the west). It faces onto Lyme Bay and is on the Dorset and East Devon Coast Jurassic Coast World Heritage Site. A sea wall provides access to the mostly shingle beach stretching for about a mile, and a small harbour, located mainly in the Axmouth area.

Seaton's recorded population at the 2011 census, was 8,413, whilst the Seaton and Beer Urban Area that includes Colyton had an estimated population of 12,815 in 2012. The Seaton electoral ward, which includes Beer, Axmouth and Colyton, had a population of 7,096 at the above census.

History

A farming community existed here 4,000 years before the Romans arrived and there were Iron Age forts in the vicinity at Seaton Down, Hawkesdown Hill, Blackbury Camp and Berry Camp. During Roman times this was an important port although the town's Roman remains have been reburied to preserve them. In Saxon times Seaton was known as Fluta or Fleet, the Saxon word for creek. The town of Fleet was founded by Saxon Charter in 1005 AD. The first mention of Seaton was in a papal bull by Pope Eugenius in 1146.

Seaton was an important port for several centuries, supplying ships and sailors for Edward I's wars against Scotland and France. In the 14th century heavy storms caused a landslip which partially blocked the estuary, and the shingle bank started to build up. In 1868 the arrival of the railway reduced the use of the harbour.

In November 2013 builder Laurence Egerton, a metal detector enthusiast, unearthed the Seaton Down Hoard of copper-alloy coins. The hoard, of about 22,000 Roman coins, is believed to be one of the largest and best-preserved 4th-century collections ever found in Britain. A team of archaeologists carefully removed and cleaned the coins over the next 10 months.

Railway
Seaton was served by a branch line, opened in 1868, from Seaton Junction on the Salisbury to Exeter main line. The railway was successful and considerably assisted in the development of Seaton as a holiday destination. A Warners holiday camp opened in 1935 close to the station, encouraged by the ease of travel.

With the increase in car ownership in the 1960s, usage of the line declined, and with many other Devon branch lines, it closed in 1966. The nearest railway station now is at Axminster, seven miles away.

Part of the trackbed was purchased in 1969 to construct Seaton Tramway, which opened in 1970 and links Seaton with Colyford and Colyton.

Holiday resort

In the 19th century Seaton developed as a holiday resort, which it remains to this day. After much protest Seaton lost its largest holiday camp at the beginning of 2009 when the site was purchased by Tesco who opened a major supermarket on the site in late 2011. However, Seaton still has many accommodation providers including guest houses, hotels, a camping site and a caravan park.

The church on the edge of town was built in the 14th century, with a squat tower dating from the 15th century. Seaton is also notable for having one of the world's first concrete bridges, built over the River Axe in 1877, by the Seaton and Beer Railway company. This is one of the earliest concrete bridges in Britain. Many of the town buildings are Victorian, including a notable collection of large houses at Seaton Hole, but the town also has notable buildings from the 1930s and later periods. Seaton Town Hall, now used as a theatre, was completed in 1904.

Present
There are 3,300 homes in the parish, of which approximately one third are of single-person occupancy. The majority of those persons are of pensionable age.

Politically, Seaton is a civil parish and town, in the district of East Devon.

The area to the east of the retail area to the River Axe (mainly floodplain) has been the subject of a regeneration plan formulated in 2003 and approved in detail in 2009, despite local opposition. As of early 2011, the level of the site has been raised above flood level using a million tons of sand brought in by sea. A large Tesco supermarket and filling station have been built on one half of this site: the other half is to be offered for residential development. A Jurassic Coast Discovery Centre has also been erected nearby, being completed in 2016. A further residential development is planned along the riverside.

As of October 2019 work has begun on a £200,000 skate-park.

Transport

Roads

Seaton is just off the A3052 which starts at Exeter to the West and Lyme Regis to the East.

Public transport 
Seaton's nearest railway station is at Axminster (around 7 miles away) which is on the West of England line linking Exeter to London Waterloo.

Some of the bus services in the town are provided by AVMT Buses who run services to many of the nearby towns and villages including Axminster, Branscombe, Sidmouth, Colyton, Beer, Devon & Lyme Regis.

Stagecoach operates services to Exeter via Sidmouth, while Dartline operate limited services to Honiton and onwards to Taunton.

Cycle Route

Seaton in on the National cycle network.

Natural history

Geology 
As befits a 'gateway town' to the world heritage site, the coastal cliffs either side of Seaton have long been of interest to geologists. To the East are the characteristically red-coloured cliffs of Triassic age rocks assigned to the Branscombe Mudstone Formation, capped by younger rocks (Cretaceous) of the Upper Greensand Formation and finally by chalk. The Seaton Fault, which is visible at Seaton Hole at the western end of the beach, is responsible for the presence of significant chalk cliffs extending to Beer Head. In common with much of this coast the cliffs in this area are prone to landslip and collapse, such movement restricting coastal development and presenting a hazard to those walking the coast.

Wildlife
The area around Seaton is rich in wildlife. The agricultural landscape supports areas of ancient woodland (often with displays of bluebells), important networks of hedges, unimproved grassland and springline mires.

Around Beer there are remnants of flower-rich chalk grassland, a rare habitat in Devon. The Axe Estuary, with its areas of grazing marsh, and the River Axe itself, are of international importance for their aquatic communities. To the east of the Axe lies the Axmouth to Lyme Regis Undercliffs National Nature Reserve. This large area of coastal landslides and cliffs supports important woodland and grassland habitats and is of considerable significance for its geology, as witnessed by its inclusion in the Jurassic Coast World Heritage Site. To the west of the Axe is a series of nature reserves, collectively known as Seaton Wetlands and including Seaton Marshes, Black Hole Marsh, Colyford Common and Stafford Marsh. Between them, these reserves include freshwater grazing marshes, intertidal lagoons, scrapes, ditches and bird hides, and are host to a diverse variety of birds and mammals.

Eurasian otters are present on the River Axe, and at the end of 2009 are being seen regularly on Seaton marshes/Colyford Common. Dormice are present throughout the area. To the west, near Beer, are man-made caves of importance for a diversity of hibernating bats, including the very rare Bechstein's bat. The Axe Estuary and its marshes are important for wintering wildfowl and waders, such as Eurasian curlew and common redshank, while in the summer butterflies and dragonflies abound. In 2007, an Audouin's gull was seen here – the fourth British record of this bird.

Attractions
Seaton Tramway offers a 3-mile ride through the Axe and Coly valleys to Colyford and Colyton. It runs alongside the Axe estuary, giving panoramic views of the nature reserves and the estuary wildlife. In June 2018, the Tramway opened a brand new £2 million station building at Seaton, a fully enclosed facility, featuring a four track layout, Claude's Diner and gift shop.

At Beer, about two miles west of Seaton, is the Beer Heights Light Railway; along with numerous model railways this is part of Pecorama, a tourist attraction provided by the model railway manufacturer Peco.

On 26 March 2016 the Seaton Jurassic visitor centre opened in the town which is a time travelling experience telling the story of the natural heritage of the Jurassic Coast past and present.

Industry
Its position next to floodplains and hemmed in by hills on either side means expansion is difficult and has hampered growth of local employment. In 2010 redevelopment of a large portion of the town commenced with new business sites providing a surge in non-seasonal employment.

References

External links

Seaton Town Council
Devon County Council – Seaton Town Profiles

 
Towns in Devon
Seaside resorts in England
Beaches of Devon
Populated coastal places in Devon
Jurassic Coast
East Devon District